Fabian Miesenböck (born 7 July 1993) is an Austrian professional footballer who plays as a winger for Austrian Bundesliga club Austria Klagenfurt.

Personal life
Miesenböck is the brother of footballer Marco Miesenböck.

Honours 
Spartak Trnava
 Slovnaft Cup: 2018–19

External links
 
 

1993 births
Sportspeople from Klagenfurt
Footballers from Carinthia (state)
Living people
Austrian footballers
Austrian expatriate footballers
Association football midfielders
SK Austria Klagenfurt players
LASK players
SC Wiener Neustadt players
FC Spartak Trnava players
SV Mattersburg players
Austrian Football Bundesliga players
2. Liga (Austria) players
Austrian Regionalliga players
Slovak Super Liga players
Expatriate footballers in Slovakia
Austrian expatriate sportspeople in Slovakia